Atomariini is a tribe of silken fungus beetles in the family Cryptophagidae. There are about 5 genera and at least 70 described species in Atomariini.

Genera
These five genera belong to the tribe Atomariini:
 Atomaria Stephens, 1829 i c g b
 Curelius Casey, 1900 i c g b
 Ephistemus Stephens, 1829 i c g b
 Parephistemus Casey, 1924 i c g
 Tisactia Casey, 1900 i c g b
Data sources: i = ITIS, c = Catalogue of Life, g = GBIF, b = Bugguide.net

References

Further reading

External links

 

Cryptophagidae